The 1936 VFL Grand Final was an Australian rules football game contested between the Collingwood Football Club and South Melbourne Football Club at the Melbourne Cricket Ground on 3 October 1936. It was the 38th annual Grand Final of the Victorian Football League, staged to determine the premiers for the 1936 VFL season. The match, attended by 74,091 spectators, was won by Collingwood by a margin of 11 points, marking that club's eleventh premiership victory.

Background
This was the second successive year in which Collingwood and South Melbourne met in a premiership decider, with Collingwood having won the 1935 VFL Grand Final. South Melbourne had contested all of the previous four Grand Finals but had emerged victorious only once, winning the 1933 VFL Grand Final.

On the eve of the finals series star Collingwood full-forward Gordon Coventry was suspended for eight weeks for striking Richmond's Joe Murdoch. As it was the first time Coventry had been reported in seventeen seasons of VFL football, there was surprise at the severity of the suspension. Coventry announced his retirement, but returned, after much persuasion, for one more season.

Teams

Match summary

Collingwood opened brilliantly with a goal to Knight one minute after the opening bounce. Todd added another and a flurry of misses followed. At this stage, Collingwood was dominating the play, but then Nash finally scored South Melbourne's first goal before Robertson kicked their second.

Epilogue
They would not be premiers again until 1953. Having participated in the last four Grand Finals, South Melbourne would not participate in another season decider until the infamous 1945 bloodbath, and would have to wait until 2005, by which time the club had become known as the Sydney Swans, to taste premiership success.

Score

See also
 1936 VFL season

References

Bibliography
 

VFL/AFL Grand Finals
Grand
Collingwood Football Club
Sydney Swans